Manuel Komnenos Doukas, Latinized as Ducas (Manouēl Komnēnos Doukas; c. 1187 – c. 1241), commonly simply Manuel Doukas (Μανουήλ Δούκας) and rarely also called Manuel Angelos (Μανουήλ Ἄγγελος), was ruler of Thessalonica from 1230 to 1237 and, after his expulsion from Thessalonica, of Thessaly from 1239 until his death in c. 1241.

Life
Manuel was a legitimate son of the sebastokratōr John Doukas. He was thus a first cousin of the emperors Isaac II Angelos and Alexios III Angelos, and a brother of Michael I Komnenos Doukas and Theodore Komnenos Doukas of Epirus.

He married the sister of Serbian Grand Prince Stefan Nemanjić (r. 1196–1228).

Career
Probably after 1225 or 1227 he was given the court dignity of despotes by his brother, Theodore. In 1225, he married Maria Asen, the illegitimate daughter of Ivan Asen II of Bulgaria, helping to cement his brother's alliance with this country.

After his brother's defeat and capture by the Bulgarians at the Battle of Klokotnitsa in 1230, Manuel was allowed by Ivan Asen II to rule in Thessalonica and its environs with the title of despotes. At one point Manuel tried to establish contacts with the Papacy, but in 1232 the longstanding breach with the Eastern Patriarchate at Nicaea was finally healed. In 1235 Manuel join forces with Nicaeans and Bulgarians in the siege of Konstantinopol from John Duka Vatatses and tsar Ivan Asen II.

Manuel ruled until 1237, when his widowed father-in-law Ivan Asen II married Irene, the daughter of the captive Theodore.  At this point Theodore and his sons were released from captivity and resolved to recover the rule of Thessalonica. Manuel was unsuccessful in seeking the support of Prince Geoffrey II Villehardouin of Achaea and was forced to flee to Asia Minor.

After a spell among the Seljuks of Rum and in Nicaea, Manuel returned to Greece with Nicaean support in 1239 and captured several fortresses including Larissa and Pharsalos from Theodore's son John Komnenos Doukas, establishing himself as ruler of Thessaly. Theodore and John had to agree to a division of the family lands. When Manuel died about 1241, the area passed into the hands of his other nephew, Michael II Komnenos Doukas of Epirus.

Family
Manuel married Serbian princess Jefimija Nemanjić, sister of Stefan Nemanjić (r. 1196–1228). However, she could not have lived long, as in 1225 he married again, with Bulgarian princess Maria Asen, illegitimate daughter of Ivan Asen II and a mistress, in an arranged marriage, part of a pact. There is no information of them having any children.

Manuel may have had a daughter named Helena, who married Guglielmo I da Verona, triarch of Euboea, father of Guglielmo II da Verona.

References

Sources
 
 
 

1180s births
1240s deaths
13th-century Byzantine people
Manuel
Medieval rulers of Thessaly
Manuel
Despots (court title)
13th-century rulers in Europe